Biestrzynnik  is a village in the administrative district of Gmina Ozimek, within Opole County, Opole Voivodeship, in south-western Poland.

References

Biestrzynnik